Sayella chesapeakea is a species of minute sea snail, a marine gastropod mollusk in the family Pyramidellidae, the pyrams and their allies.

Description
The length of the shell measures 3.9 mm.

Distribution
This marine species occurs in the following locations:
 Northwest Atlantic Ocean (Maryland to North Carolina)

Notes
Additional information regarding this species:
 Distribution: Range: 38.5°N to 35°N; 77°W to 76°W. Distribution: USA: Maryland, Virginia, North Carolina

References

 Bisby, F.A., M.A. Ruggiero, K.L. Wilson, M. Cachuela-Palacio, S.W. Kimani, Y.R. Roskov, A. Soulier-Perkins and J. van Hertum 2005 Species 2000 & ITIS Catalogue of Life: 2005 Annual Checklist. CD-ROM; Species 2000: Reading, U.K.

External links
 To Biodiversity Heritage Library (2 publications)
 To Encyclopedia of Life
 To USNM Invertebrate Zoology Mollusca Collection
 To ITIS
 To World Register of Marine Species

Pyramidellidae
Gastropods described in 1939